Proevippa is a genus of spiders in the family Lycosidae. It was first described in 1903 by Purcell. , it contains 11 African species.

Species
Proevippa comprises the following species:
Proevippa albiventris (Simon, 1898)
Proevippa biampliata (Purcell, 1903)
Proevippa bruneipes (Purcell, 1903)
Proevippa dregei (Purcell, 1903)
Proevippa eberlanzi (Roewer, 1959)
Proevippa fascicularis (Purcell, 1903)
Proevippa hirsuta (Russell-Smith, 1981)
Proevippa lightfooti Purcell, 1903
Proevippa schreineri (Purcell, 1903)
Proevippa unicolor (Roewer, 1960)
Proevippa wanlessi (Russell-Smith, 1981)

References

Lycosidae
Araneomorphae genera
Spiders of Africa